Massacre (briefly known as Massacre X and Gods of Death) is an American death metal band. They were formed in 1984 by Allen West, Bill Andrews, and Mike Borders, soon after vocalist Kam Lee joined. The band has reunited several times with varying line-ups, most recently in late 2016.

History 
Massacre were formed in 1984 by Allen West (guitar), Bill Andrews (drums), Mike Borders (bass) and soon joined by Kam Lee. After their first demo their line-up settled with Rick Rozz (formerly of Mantas, an early incarnation of Death) on guitar, and bassist Terry Butler. They disbanded and re-united again several times. In 1987, Rozz, Andrews and Butler joined Death. After being fired by Death in 1989, Rick Rozz reformed Massacre with Lee and they managed to get a deal with Earache Records, releasing their debut album From Beyond in 1991, followed by an EP, Inhuman Condition (featuring Cronos of Venom), a year later. After the release of the EP the band split up again. Rozz reformed the band in 1993 and released a new album Promise in 1996. Kam Lee left the band during post-production of Promise due to being dissatisfied with the songs and his performance, disowning the album. The album was widely hated by fans and Kenny Goodwin replaced Lee temporarily at the time. The band quickly broke up after Promise was released. Kam Lee, Terry Butler and Steve Swanson along with Sam Williams and Curtis Beeson temporarily reunited as Massacre in 2006. Butler, Lee, Beeson and Williams then founded Denial Fiend, with Blaine Cook replacing Lee and Rob Rampy replacing Beeson in 2008. In 2011, Butler and Rozz reunited for an anniversary tour of From Beyond beginning January 14 in Tampa, Florida.

Reformation 
Butler and Rozz reformed Massacre in late 2011, with Mike Mazzonetto on drums and Ed Webb on vocals, and subsequently played the 70,000 Tons of Metal cruise from Miami, Florida to Grand Cayman in January 2012. In March 2012, under the wing of lawyer Eric Greif – coincidentally Butler and Rozz's manager in Death – the band signed an international recording deal with Century Media Records, announcing a 7" release prior to their August 2012 appearance at the Wacken Festival in Germany and the release of their album in early 2014.

On December 11, 2014, it was announced that bassist Terry Butler and vocalist Ed Webb left the band. As the result, Massacre disbanded.

Massacre reformed once more in December 2016 under the name Massacre X, in reference to it being the band's tenth line-up. However, original drummer Bill Andrews threatened to sue the band over the use of the name, leading to them rebranding themselves as Gods of Death, in reference to their significance in the development of death metal. Michael Grim went on to form the secretive death metal band known as Primordial Jizzum. The band eventually returned to using the original Massacre moniker in July 2019, with former bassist Michael Borders returning to the band.

On September 9, 2019, it was announced that Rick Rozz and Mike Mazzonetto had both quit the band, according to founding member Kam Lee. The band announced a new line-up three months later and plans to release a new studio album in 2020. However, less than a year later, it was announced new members Taylor Nordberg and Jeramie Kling had left the band. A week later, the band announced its latest line-up with new guitarists Rogga Johansson, Jonny Pettersson, and Scott Fairfax, as well as new drummer Brynjar Helgetun.

On August 6, 2021, the band announced that their new album, Resurgence, would be released on October 22.

Associated acts 
Members and ex-members of Massacre have played in many notable bands, most notably Death, Obituary, Six Feet Under, Metalucifer, Hate Plow, Kreator, Nasty Savage, Primordial Jizzum, Zero Hour and Whiplash.

Band members

Current members 
Kam Lee – vocals 
Michael Borders – bass 
Scott Fairfax – lead guitar 
Rogga Johansson – rhythm guitar 
Jonny Pettersson – rhythm guitar 
Brynjar Helgetun – drums

Former members 
Bill Andrews – drums 
Rick Rozz – rhythm guitar (1984–1986, 1989–1996, 2011–2014, 2017–2019), lead guitar (1986–1987, 1989–1991, 1993–1996, 2011–2014, 2017–2019)
Allen West – lead guitar 
Mark Brents – vocals 
J.P. Chartier – rhythm guitar 
Scott Blackwood – bass 
Rob Goodwin – rhythm guitar 
Terry Butler – bass 
Butch Gonzales – bass 
Joe Cangelosi – drums 
Steve Swanson – lead guitar 
Pete Sison – bass 
Syrus Peters – drums 
Kenny Goodwin – vocals, rhythm guitar 
Sam Williams – rhythm guitar 
Curtis Beeson – drums 
Dave Pybus – bass 
Mike Mazzonetto – drums (2011–2014, 2017–2019)
Ed Webb – vocals 
Michael "Big Nasty" Grim – bass 
Taylor Nordberg – guitars 
Jeramie Kling – drums

Timeline

Discography

Studio albums 
 From Beyond (1991)
 Promise (1996)
 Back from Beyond (2014)
 Resurgence (2021)

EPs 
 Inhuman Condition (1992)
 Condemned to the Shadows (2012)
 Mythos (2022)

Demos 
 Aggressive Tyrant (1986)
 Chamber of Ages (1986)
 The Second Coming (1990)

Compilations 
 Tyrants of Death (2006, Iron Pegasus)
 The Second Coming (2008, Hell's Headbangers)

References 

1983 establishments in Florida
Death metal musical groups from Florida
Earache Records artists
Musical groups established in 1983
Musical groups from Tampa, Florida